Steampunk'd is an American reality television series broadcast by Game Show Network. The series, hosted by Jeannie Mai, premiered August 19, 2015. The contestants (called "makers") are crafters and designers who specialize in the steampunk genre.

Production
The series was green-lit on March 10, 2015, along with Lie Detectors. GSN later announced Mai as host on June 15. The series premiered August 19, 2015.

Contestants
The 10 steampunk artists competing in the first season are:

Contestant Progress

 The contestant won Steampunk'd.
  The contestant was the Runner-Up.
  The contestant in 3rd Place.
 The contestant was on the winning team that week.
 The contestant was on the losing team that week, but was safe.
 The contestant was in the bottom 2.
 The contestant was eliminated.
 The contestant was on the winning team, but was eliminated.
‡ The contestant was the team captain that week.

Teams

References

External links

 at GSNTV.com

2010s American reality television series
2015 American television series debuts
English-language television shows
Game Show Network original programming
Steampunk television series